The Department of Animal Husbandry, Dairying and Fisheries of state of Tamil Nadu is one of the Department of Government of Tamil Nadu

Sub - Departments

Undertakings & Bodies

Present Ministers for Animal Husbandry 
 Anitha R. Radhakrishnan

Former Ministers for Animal Husbandry 
2017_2021K.Radhakrishnan
 2016 - 2017
 P.Balakrishna Reddy
 2011 - 2016
 T. K. M. Chinnayya

Present Ministers for Milk and Dairying 
s.m.nasar

Former Ministers for Milk and Dairying 
 2011 - 2016
 V. Moorthy
 2006 - 2011
 U. Mathivanan

Present Ministers for Fisheries 
D. Jayakumar

Former Ministers for Fisheries 
 2011 - 2016
 K. A. Jayapal

See also 
 Government of Tamil Nadu
 Tamil Nadu Government's Departments
  Department of Animal Husbandry, Dairying and Fisheries (India)
 Department of Finance (Kerala)
 Animal husbandry in India

References

External links
  www.tn.gov.in/departments/ahf.html  (Official Website of the Animal Husbandry, Dairying and Fisheries Department, Tamil Nadu)
   www.tn.gov.in/rti/proact_ahf.htm   (RTI Site of the Animal Husbandry, Dairying and Fisheries Department, Tamil Nadu)
 (Official website of Government of Tamil Nadu)

Tamil Nadu state government departments
Animal husbandry in Tamil Nadu
Agriculture in Tamil Nadu
Tamil Nadu
Tamil Nadu